The Mackerel-class submarines''' were a pair of experimental prototype submarines built just prior to World War II and launched in 1940 and 1941. The two submarines were similar in size and capability to the S-class submarines built at the end of World War I, and had been ordered to test the feasibility of using mass production techniques to build small submarines. Until at least 1940 it was thought that mass production of fleet submarines would be impractical, and in any case small submarines could provide area defense for submarine bases. Once it became apparent that there would be sufficient production of the more capable s, interest in the design waned and no additional small submarines were ordered. In some references, the Mackerels are called the "M class".

Design

The Mackerels stemmed from design studies ordered by the Navy's General Board beginning in 1936, when Admiral Thomas C. Hart joined the Board and spearheaded the small submarine effort. At the time it was felt that mass production of large fleet submarines would be impractical. It was also felt necessary to replace the aging S, R, and O-class submarines, to provide area defense for submarine bases and operate in restricted waters. For the Mackerels, two somewhat different designs were produced by the Electric Boat Company and Portsmouth Navy Yard. As prototypes, Mackerel and Marlin were near-sisters rather than sisters. References agree that Mackerel used a direct drive propulsion arrangement, but differ as to whether Marlin had direct drive or diesel-electric drive.Gardiner and Chesneau, pp. 144-145 Both had engine designs not used in other US Navy submarines; Mackerel an in-house Electric Boat design, Marlin an ALCO locomotive design. By late 1941 it became apparent that fleet submarines could be mass-produced, and interest in small submarines began to wane. Interest in them was revived with the examination of the German U-570, a Type VII U-boat captured by the British and loaned to the US. Also, Admiral Hart returned to the General Board in late 1942, following a courageous part in the ultimately futile defense of the Philippines and Indonesia in 1941-42. He pointed out that no other navy had abandoned small submarines. However, Admiral Frederick J. Horne, Vice Chief of Naval Operations, felt that small submarines should only be built if there was no interference with fleet submarine production. With all submarine yards capable of building fleet submarines, there was no easy way to avoid impacting their production, so the small submarine was abandoned as a concept.

Service

Both submarines spent their entire careers operating from Submarine Base New London, Connecticut and Portsmouth Navy Yard in training and research roles, contributing to the development of both submarine and antisubmarine warfare in World War II. On 12 April 1942 Mackerel was attacked by a German U-boat while transiting to Norfolk, Virginia, but the torpedoes missed and Mackerels counter-attack was unsuccessful. Marlin appeared as the fictional Corsair in the 1943 movie Crash Dive, filmed at Submarine Base New London. After the war, both boats were decommissioned in November 1945 and scrapped in 1946-47.

Ships in class

See also
 Unrestricted submarine warfare
 Torpedo
 List of submarine classes of the United States Navy
 List of lost United States submarines
 List of submarines of the Second World War

References
Citations

Sources
 Alden, John D., Commander (USN, Ret). The Fleet Submarine in the U.S. Navy: A Design and Construction History. Annapolis: Naval Institute Press, 1979. .
 Lenton, H. T. American Submarines (Navies of the Second World War) (Doubleday, 1973), .
 Silverstone, Paul H., U.S. Warships of World War II (Ian Allan, 1965), .
 Gardiner, Robert and Chesneau, Roger, Conway's All the World's Fighting Ships 1922–1946'', Conway Maritime Press, 1980. .

External links

 https://web.archive.org/web/20140322093118/http://www.fleetsubmarine.com/sublist.html
 Navsource.org fleet submarines page
 Pigboats.com USS Mackerel photo page
 DiGiulian, Tony Navweaps.com later 3"/50 caliber gun

Mackerel
 
 Mackerel